The Inglis quarry or Inglis quarry sites  1A and 1C are assemblages of vertebrate fossils dating from the Pleistocene ~1.8 Mya—300,000 years ago, located in the phosphate quarries near the town of Inglis, Citrus County, northern Florida.

Inglis sites FCi-1, FCi-2, Inglis Formation, Florida Geological Survey C-11, Inglis Member, Moodys Branch Formation, and Dunellon Phosphate Company pit no. 5 are composed of a variety of bivalves, echinoderms, gastropods, crustaceans (mud shrimp), crinoids dating from the Eocene to Early Oligocene of ~48–33.9 Mya.

Species uncovered

Mammals

Bats
Antrozous (Palid Bat)
Eptesicus (House Bat)
Myotis (Mouse-eared Bat)
Desmodus, D. archaeodaptes (Common Vampire Bat)
Lasiurus intermedius (Northern Yellow Bat)
Phyllostomidae (Leaf-nosed Bat)
Pipistrellus subflavus (Eastern Pipistrelle)
Plecotus (Lump-nosed Bat)

Carnivores
Procyon (Raccoon)

Canidae
†Borophagus (ancient dog)
Canidae
†Canis edwardii (wolf) 
†Urocyon citrinus (fox)

Bears
†Arctodus pristinus (Lesser short-faced bear)

Feliformia
Felinae indet. 
†Xenosmilus hodsonae
Lynx 
†Miracinonyx inexpectatus (American cheetah)
†Smilodon gracilis (Saber-toothed cat)

Hyena
†Chasmaporthetes ossifragus

MustelidsLontra canadensis (North American river otter)Spilogale (Eastern spotted skunk) 
†Trigonictis macrodon

Herbivores

Even-toed ungulates
Bovidae indet 
†Capromeryx (Pronghorn-like) 
†Hemiauchenia macrocephala (Llama) 
†Mylohyus floridanus(Peccary)Odocoileus (White-tailed deer)
†Platygonus bicalcaratus, P. vetus (Peccary)

Odd-toed ungulates
†Equus leidyi (Horse)
†Tapirus lundeliusi (Tapir)

Proboscidea
†Mammut americanum (American mastodon)

Xenarthra
†Eremotherium eomigrans (ground sloth)
†Megalonyx leptostomus (ground sloth)
†Paramylodon harlani (Harlan's ground sloth)
†Dasypus bellus (Armadillo)
†Holmesina floridanus (Armadillo-like)
†Glyptotherium texanum (Glyptodont)

RabbitsSylvilagus (Cottontail rabbit)

Rodents
Baiomys (New World Pygmy Mouse)
Erethizon, E. kleini (Porcupine) 
Geomys pinetis (Pocket gopher)
Glaucomys (Flying Squirrel) 
Neochoerus aesopi (N. American Capabara)
Neotoma
Ondatra idahoensis (Muskrat)
Orthogeomys propinetis (Gopher) 
Peromyscus, P. sarmocophinus (Deer Mouse)
Reithrodontomys H. wetmorei (harvest mouse)
Sciurus carolinensis (Eastern Grey Squirrel)
Sigmodon, S. curtisi (Rat)

Moles and Shrews
Blarina (American Short-Tailed Shrew)
Blarina carolinensis (Southern Short-Tailed Shrew)
Cryptotis parva (North American Least Shrew)
Scalopus aquaticus (Eastern Mole)
Sorex longirostris (Southeastern Shrew)

Birds
Cariamiformes
†Titanis walleri'''' (Terror bird)

See also
Other Citrus County sites:
Crystal River Nuclear Plant

References

Paleobiology database collections: Inglis IA
Paleobiology database: Inglis 1C collections
Florida Center for Library Information
Pleistocene mammals of North America By Björn Kurtén, Elaine Anderson, p. 164, Columbia University Press

Paleontological sites of Florida
Geography of Citrus County, Florida